Christian Satellite Network (CSN) International is a Christian radio network based in Twin Falls, Idaho. KAWZ, 89.9 MHz, in Twin Falls is the uplink station, feeding 337 broadcast translators nationwide and 42 full-power radio stations across the United States, including Alaska and the Hawaiian Islands. CSN is a non-profit organization and operates non-profit stations.

History
KAWZ began broadcasting on April 3, 1988 (Easter Sunday), with Pastor Mike Kestler as its founder. The network was launched on April 26, 1995, broadcasting Christian radio over satellite from KAWZ in Twin Falls. The first satellite-fed translator to begin receiving the network from KAWZ was in Yucca Valley, California, and within six months the network had dozens of translators. It was originally known as the Calvary Satellite Network.

By 1999, the network had grown to include 153 stations and translators, and by 2004 it had grown to approximately 400 stations and translators across the United States.

In 2007, an agreement was reached between the Twin Falls, Idaho based network and parties associated with Calvary Chapel Costa Mesa where the Twin Falls, Idaho based network kept 424 of the network's 457 stations and translators, but could no longer use Calvary Chapel branding. Most of the stations received by the parties associated with Calvary Chapel Costa Mesa were sold to the Calvary Radio Network the following year.

Board members 
Board members of the Christian Satellite Network (CSN) and its parent company, Christian Broadcasting of Idaho, are Pastor Mike Kestler and Ariel Kestler. Mike Kestler is pastor of The River Christian Fellowship, a nondenominational church in Twin Falls.

Programming 
CSN International airs a variety of Christian talk and teaching programs, such as: A New Beginning with Greg Laurie, Jay Sekulow Live, Family Talk with James Dobson, Love Worth Finding with Adrian Rogers, Thru the Bible with Dr. J. Vernon McGee, Truth For Life with Alistair Begg, and Turning Point with David Jeremiah. CSN International also airs a variety of Christian contemporary music.

Stations
CSN international is heard on 42 radio stations in the United States.

Notes:

Translators
CSN International is relayed by many additional translators nationwide.

References

External links 
CSN International
CSN webcast
To Every Man An Answer
The River Christian Fellowship - home of CSN International
KEFX Christian rock "sister" station to CSN International

Christian radio stations in the United States
American radio networks
Radio stations established in 1995
1995 establishments in Idaho
Radio broadcasting companies of the United States